In mathematics, the Pontryagin classes, named after Lev Pontryagin, are certain characteristic classes of real vector bundles. The Pontryagin classes lie in cohomology groups with degrees a multiple of four.

Definition 
Given a real vector bundle E over M, its k-th Pontryagin class  is defined as 

where:
 denotes the -th Chern class of the complexification  of E, 
 is the -cohomology group of M with integer coefficients.

Properties 
The total Pontryagin class 

is (modulo 2-torsion) multiplicative with respect to 
Whitney sum of vector bundles, i.e., 

for two vector bundles E and F over M.  In terms of the individual Pontryagin classes pk, 

and so on.

The vanishing of the Pontryagin classes and Stiefel–Whitney classes of a vector bundle does not guarantee that the vector bundle is trivial.  For example, up to vector bundle isomorphism, there is a unique nontrivial rank 10 vector bundle  over the 9-sphere.  (The clutching function for  arises from the homotopy group .)  The Pontryagin classes and Stiefel-Whitney classes all vanish: the Pontryagin classes don't exist in degree 9, and the Stiefel–Whitney class w9 of E10 vanishes by the Wu formula w9 = w1w8 + Sq1(w8).  Moreover, this vector bundle is stably nontrivial, i.e. the Whitney sum of E10 with any trivial bundle remains nontrivial. 

Given a 2k-dimensional vector bundle E we have 

where e(E) denotes the Euler class of E, and  denotes the cup product of cohomology classes.

Pontryagin classes and curvature 
As was shown by Shiing-Shen Chern and André Weil around 1948, the rational Pontryagin classes 

can be presented as differential forms which depend polynomially on the curvature form of a vector bundle. This Chern–Weil theory revealed a major connection between algebraic topology and global differential geometry.

For a vector bundle E over a n-dimensional differentiable manifold M equipped with a connection, the total Pontryagin class is expressed as 

where Ω denotes the curvature form, and H*dR(M) denotes the de Rham cohomology groups.

Pontryagin classes of a manifold 
The Pontryagin classes of a smooth manifold are defined to be the Pontryagin classes of its tangent bundle.

Novikov proved in 1966 that if two compact, oriented, smooth manifolds are homeomorphic then their rational Pontryagin classes pk(M, Q) in H4k(M, Q) are the same.

If the dimension is at least five, there are at most finitely many different smooth manifolds with given homotopy type and Pontryagin classes.

Pontryagin classes from Chern classes 
The Pontryagin classes of a complex vector bundle  can be completely determined by its Chern classes. This follows from the fact that , the Whitney sum formula, and properties of Chern classes of its complex conjugate bundle. Then, this given the relationfor example, we can apply this formula to find the Pontryagin classes of a vector bundle on a curve and a surface. For a curve, we haveso all of the Pontryagin classes of complex vector bundles are trivial. On a surface, we haveshowing . On line bundles this simplifies further since  by dimension reasons.

Pontryagin classes on a Quartic K3 Surface 
Since  in this case, we have

. This number can be used to compute the third stable homotopy group of spheres.

Pontryagin numbers 
Pontryagin numbers are certain topological invariants of a smooth manifold. Each Pontryagin number of a manifold M vanishes if the dimension of M is not divisible by 4. It is defined in terms of the Pontryagin classes of the manifold M as follows:

Given a smooth -dimensional manifold M and a collection of natural numbers 
 such that ,
the Pontryagin number  is defined by

where  denotes the k-th Pontryagin class and [M] the fundamental class of M.

Properties 
Pontryagin numbers are oriented cobordism invariant; and together with Stiefel-Whitney numbers they determine an oriented manifold's oriented cobordism class.
Pontryagin numbers of closed Riemannian manifolds (as well as Pontryagin classes) can be calculated as integrals of certain polynomials from the curvature tensor of a Riemannian manifold.
Invariants such as signature and -genus can be expressed through Pontryagin numbers. For the theorem describing the linear combination of Pontryagin numbers giving the signature see Hirzebruch signature theorem.

Generalizations 
There is also a quaternionic Pontryagin class, for vector bundles with quaternion structure.

See also 
Chern–Simons form
Hirzebruch signature theorem

References

External links
 

Characteristic classes
Differential topology